is a subway station in the Tokyo Metro network. It is located in Kita, Tokyo. The station is the least used on the entire Metro network. Kyu-Furukawa Gardens can be reached by walking from this station.

Lines 

Tokyo Metro Namboku Line (station number N-15)

Platform
The platform is a simple island configuration

Passenger statistics

With an average of 8,785 passengers daily in fiscal 2018, the station is the least used on the entire Tokyo Metro network and the only station on the network to have an average of less than 10,000 users per day.

The passenger statistics for previous years are as shown below.

History 
Nishigahara Station opened on 29 November 1991.

The station facilities were inherited by Tokyo Metro after the privatization of the Teito Rapid Transit Authority (TRTA) in 2004.

References

External links

 Nishigahara Station Information (Tokyo Metro) 

Railway stations in Tokyo
Railway stations in Japan opened in 1991
Tokyo Metro Namboku Line